Gail Tremblay (born 1945) is an American writer and artist with Mi'kmaq and Onondaga ancestry. A professor at The Evergreen State College since 1981, she lives and works in Washington State. Tremblay received a Washington State Governor's Arts and Heritage Award in 2001.

Background
Tremblay was born on December 15, 1945 in Buffalo, New York. She received her BA in drama from the University of New Hampshire and an MFA in English (Creative Writing) from the University of Oregon, Eugene in 1969.

Writing and education career
She currently teaches at The Evergreen State College in Olympia, Washington. She has been a faculty member of Evergreen State College since 1981. In writing she is largely known for poetry. Tremblay also writes essays about other artists for exhibition catalogues and books. She wrote the catalogue essay, "Speaking in a Language of Vital Signs," for the 2008 exhibition catalogue, Joe Feddersen: Vital Signs at the Hallie Ford Museum of Art at Willamette University.

Visual art

Tremblay combines traditional techniques and materials with contemporary artistic expression, such as her woven pieces and baskets, created from experimental materials such as exposed film. Her poetry and art is inspired by her cultural heritage, sometimes drawing on traditional Native American motifs.

Her aunts taught her basketry techniques and forms which she reinterpreted through the use of film stock and film leader as materials. Tremblay's art draws from Native American history, Indigenous cosmologies, literature, Western movies, and other pop culture references. For example, she created a basket using red and white film leader entitled, And Then There's the Business of Fancydancing, inspired by Sherman Alexie's film, The Business of Fancydancing (2002), where the main character, a Spokane man, has a love relationship with a white man. As she said, "I chose to use Porcupine Stitch because there are so many difficult and prickly relationships between characters in this film.” Tremblay's woven basket work with film also includes When will the Red Leader Overshadow Images of the 19th Century Noble Savage in Hollywood Films that Some Think are Sympathetic to American Indians (2018), a basket woven using 35mm film from the movie Windwalker (1981), which was acquired by the Smithsonian American Art Museum in 2021.

Artweek reviewer Marcia Morse writes, “Gail Tremblay addresses the troubled history of her own indigenous heritage in And Then There is The Hollywood Indian Princess (2002). Using the Fancy Stitches of Iroquois basketry, Tremblay–instead of the traditional ash splint and sweet grass–has used recycled 16 mm leader and film on sexually transmitted diseases, elegantly subverting multiple stereotypes.”

Exhibitions 
Tremblay has staged many solo exhibitions and participated in numerous group shows. Her notable solo shows include Gail Tremblay: Fiber, Metal, Wood (1988), Museum of the Plains Indian, Browning, Montana; The Empty Fish Trap Installation (2004), Evergreen State College Gallery, Olympia, Washington; Gail Tremblay: Twenty Years of Making (2002), Daybreak Star Cultural Center, Seattle; Reframing Images, Conceptualizing Indigenous Art (2013), Froelick Gallery, Portland, Oregon; and Art of Gail Tremblay (2017), Eastern Washington University Downtown Gallery, Cheney, Washington.

Notable works in public collections 

Basket (c. 1990), Portland Art Museum, Oregon
Strawberry and Chocolate (2000), National Museum of the American Indian, Smithsonian Institution, Washington, D.C.
In the World of White Line Fever... (2001), Hallie Ford Museum of Art, Salem, Oregon
And Then There is the Hollywood Indian Princess (2002), Hallie Ford Museum of Art, Salem, Oregon
Waiting for the Return: 5 Fish Traps (2002-2003), Marian Gould Gallagher Law Library, University of Washington School of Law, Seattle (Washington State Arts Commission)
A Note to Lewis and Clark's Ghosts (2004), Hallie Ford Museum of Art, Salem, Oregon; and National Museum of the American Indian, Smithsonian Institution, Washington, D.C.
The Ghost of Salmon (2004), from Canopy End Structures (with Rick Bartow, Ken Mackintosh, and Lillian Pitt), Rosa Parks Station, TriMet, Portland, Oregon
Hunting for the Red Queen on the Big Night Out (2008), Evergreen State College, Olympia, Washington (Washington State Arts Commission)
An Iroquois Dreams That the Tribes of the Middle East Will Take the Message of Deganawida to Heart and Make Peace (2009), Whatcom Museum, Bellingham, Washington
And Then There's the Business of Fancy Dancing... (2011), Arkansas Museum of Fine Arts, Little Rock
In Great Expectations, There is no Red Leader (2011), Portland Art Museum, Oregon
It Was Never About Playing Cowboys and Indians (2012), Denver Art Museum
When will the Red Leader Overshadow Images of the 19th Century Noble Savage in Hollywood Films that Some Think are Sympathetic to American Indians (2018), Smithsonian American Art Museum, Smithsonian Institution, Washington, D.C.

Publications 

 Night Gives Women the Word (Omaha Printing Company, 1979)
 Close to Home (University of Nebraska, 1981)
 Indian Singing in 20th Century America (CALYX Books, 1990)
Farther From and Too Close to Home (CreateSpace Independent Publishing, 2013)

References 

1945 births
Living people
20th-century American women
American installation artists
American people of Native American descent
American women academics
American women artists
American writers
Artists from Buffalo, New York
Basket weavers
Evergreen State College faculty
University of Oregon alumni
University of New Hampshire alumni
Women basketweavers
Writers from Buffalo, New York
Writers from Olympia, Washington